Adrian-Vasile Gavrilă (born 1 April 1984) is a Romanian tennis player.

Gavrilă has a career high ATP singles ranking of 527 achieved on 5 November 2007. He also has a career high ATP doubles ranking of 341 achieved on 1 October 2007.

Gavrilă made his ATP main draw debut at the 2007 BCR Open Romania in the doubles draw partnering Marcel-Ioan Miron.

External links

1984 births
Living people
Romanian male tennis players
21st-century Romanian people